Magnus III may refer to:

 Magnus III of Norway (1073–1103)
 Magnus III of Sweden (1240–1290) 
 Magnus III of Orkney (1256–1273)